Never Give Up may refer to:

Film and television
 Never Give Up (1934 film), a Chinese film of the 1930s
 Never Give Up (1978 film), a Japanese film
 Never Give Up: The 20th Century Odyssey of Herbert Zipper, a 1995 documentary film
 Vai na Fé, a 2023 Brazilian telenovela, also titled Never Give Up

Songs
 "Never Give Up" (Sia song), 2016
 "Never Give Up" (Maria Sur song), 2023
 "Never Give Up (Party Party)", by Paul Haig, 1983
 "Never Give Up", by A. R. Rahman from the Million Dollar Arm film soundtrack, 2014
 "Never Give Up", by Barbra Streisand from Guilty, 1980
 "Never Give Up", by Fantastic Negrito from Please Don't Be Dead, 2018
 "Never Give Up", by Jodi Benson and Samuel E. Wright from the TV series The Little Mermaid, 1993
 "Never Give Up", by Keke Wyatt from Who Knew?, 2010
 "Never Give Up", by New Found Glory from Sticks and Stones, 2002
 "Never Give Up", by Rage from Gib dich nie auf, 2009
 "Never Give Up", by Room 2012, 2007
 "Never Give Up", by Yolanda Adams from Believe, 2001

Other uses
 Never Give Up (video game), a 2019 2D platform game
 Never Give Up!, a 1999 Japanese comic for girls by Hiromu Mutou
 Never Give Up: My Stroke, My Recovery, and My Return to the NFL, a 2007 book by Tedy Bruschi
 Never Give Up: How I Turned My Biggest Challenges into Success, a 2008 book by Donald Trump

See also
 "Never Giving Up", a song by Of Mice & Men from Restoring Force: Full Circle